Tatsuya Tanaka may refer to:

 Tatsuya Tanaka (figure skater) (born 1988), Taiwanese figure skater
 Tatsuya Tanaka (footballer, born 1982), Japanese footballer
 Tatsuya Tanaka (footballer, born 1992), Japanese footballer